Viktoras  is a Lithuanian masculine given name. It is a cognate of the English name Victor and may refer to:

People
Viktoras Andriušis (1908–1967), Lithuanian artist and designer
Viktoras Biržiška (1886–1964), Lithuanian mathematician and writer
Viktoras Budzinskis (1888–1976), Lithuanian politician
Viktoras Diawara (born 1978), Lithuanian musician
Viktoras Kulvinskas (born 1939), American nutritionist and writer
Viktoras Muntianas (born 1951), Lithuanian politician 
Viktoras Olšanskis (born 1969), Lithuanian footballer
Viktoras Petkus (1928–2012), Lithuanian political activist 
Viktoras Uspaskich (born 1959), Lithuanian politician

See also
Victor (name)

Lithuanian masculine given names